Trimezia steyermarkii is a species of flowering plant in the family Iridaceae, native to southern Mexico, Central America, Colombia, and Venezuela. Plants are up to 150 cm tall, with rhizomes up to 2–4 cm long and 2–3 cm wide; leaves are lanceolate, 60–150 cm long by 2 cm wide; flowers are yellow with brown spots. In countries like Colombia and Venezuela one of common names that is often given to this plant is "Hand of God" because of the three flower petals.

Trimezia steyermarkii is closely related to T. martinicensis, with which it has been widely confused. See that article for differences.

References

 
 
 GBIF entry
 USDA Germplasm Resources Information Network (GRIN) entry
 
 Davidse, G. et al., eds. 1994. Flora mesoamericana.
 Stevens, W. D. et al., eds. 2001. Flora de Nicaragua. Monogr. Syst. Bot. Missouri Bot. Gard. 85(1-3).
 , p. 106

steyermarkii
Flora of Mexico
Flora of Central America
Flora of South America
Plants described in 1962